Tamarack Lake is a lake in Mahnomen County, in the U.S. state of Minnesota. It was named after a grove of tamarack, near the lake.

See also
List of lakes in Minnesota

External links
Tahoe Weekly, Hiking at Echo Lakes by Tim Hauserman

References

Lakes of Minnesota
Lakes of Mahnomen County, Minnesota